Crawford Barton (June 2, 1943 – June 12, 1993) was an American photographer. His work is known for documenting the blooming of the openly gay culture in San Francisco from the late 1960s into the 1980s.

Biography
Born and raised in a fundamentalist community in rural Georgia, Barton was a shy, introspective boy. His artistic interests and fear of sports alienated him from his father, a struggling farmer. He escaped family tensions by creating a world of his own imagination, which eventually led him to receive a small art scholarship at the University of Georgia.

It was there that Barton fell in love with a man for the first time. His feelings weren't reciprocated and, after one semester, he dropped out and returned to the farm.

A couple of years later, at age 21, he enrolled in art school in Atlanta. He made new friends and found outlets for his pent-up sexual energy in that city's gay bars and clubs. During this time in Atlanta Barton received a used 35mm camera as a gift and learned basic darkroom techniques. He found his true calling in life — photography.

Barton moved to California in the late 1960s to pursue his art and life as an openly gay man. By the early 1970s he was established as a leading photographer of the “golden age of gay awakening” in San Francisco. He was as much a participant as a chronicler of this extraordinary time and place.

“I tried to serve as a chronicler, as a watcher of beautiful people — to feed back an image of a positive, likable lifestyle — to offer pleasure as well as pride,” he explained.

By the early 1980s this period was over. San Francisco and the gay community were devastated by the onset of the AIDS epidemic. Barton's lover of 22 years, Larry Lara, died of complications from AIDS before Barton himself succumbed at the age of 50 in 1993.

Photographic work
Many of Barton's images documenting long-haired freaks dancing in the street, love-ins in the park, "dykes on bikes," cross-dressers in the Castro, and leather men prowling at night have become classics of the gay world. He photographed some of the first Gay Pride parades and protests; Harvey Milk campaigning in San Francisco; and celebrities including poet Lawrence Ferlinghetti and actors Sal Mineo and Paul Winfield.

It was his circle of friends and acquaintances that inspired his most intimate erotic photography, especially his lover, Larry Lara. Barton described Lara as the “perfect specimen, as crazy and wonderful and spontaneous and free as Kerouac, so I’m never bored and never tired of looking at him.” Considered as a single body of work, his photographs of Lara dancing in the hallway of their flat on Dorland Street, a bearded hippie in the door of a cabin in Marin, a sensual nude in the hills of Land's End, suggest the fullness, richness and complexity of the man he loved most.

In addition to his fine art photography, Barton worked on assignment for The Advocate and the Bay Area Reporter, as well as The Examiner, Newsday''', and the Los Angeles Times.

Exhibitions
In 1974, the M. H. de Young Memorial Museum featured Barton's prints in a show entitled "New Photography: San Francisco and the Bay Area." His work was praised by The New York Times reviewer. Other critics labeled it “shocking” and “vulgar.”

Barton's photography has continued appearing periodically in exhibitions since his death, notably in one-artist shows at the GLBT Historical Society in San Francisco and the San Francisco LGBT Community Center in 2004 and at the Magnet men's health center in the city's Castro District in 2005. Barton's photographs of Harvey Milk also were featured in a historical exhibition cosponsored by the GLBT Historical Society at the Nouveau Latina Cinema in Paris in 2009 in conjunction with the French release of Gus Van Sant's Milk.

Publications
A book of Barton's work, Beautiful Men, was published in 1976. In addition, his photographs were used to illustrate a collection of short stories of Malcolm Boyd.Crawford Barton, Days of Hope was published posthumously in 1994 by Editions Aubrey Walter. The book features more than 60 of Barton's black and white photographs that capture the look and optimistic spirit of '70s gay San Francisco: the freedom and joy of the sexual revolution (pre-AIDS), the intimate bonds of lesbian and gay couples, and like Beautiful Men, homoerotic portraits of men.

Archives and rights
The GLBT Historical Society, an archives, research center and museum in San Francisco, holds the complete personal and professional papers and studio archives of Crawford Barton; in addition, the society owns the copyrights to Barton's work, which were transferred to the institution by the Barton estate.

Bibliography

Barton, Crawford, Beautiful Men. Los Angeles: Liberation Publications, 1976.
Barton, Crawford. Days of Hope. Foreword by Mark Thompson. London: Editions Aubrey Walter, 1994.
Barton, Crawford & Boyd, Malcolm, Look Back in Joy: A Celebration of Gay Lovers.'' Boston: Alyson Press, 1990.

Notes

External links
Homobilia: Crawford Barton Photography Exhibition
GLBT Historical Society (San Francisco): Holder of Crawford Barton's archives.

1943 births
1993 deaths
American LGBT photographers
LGBT people from California
LGBT people from Georgia (U.S. state)
American LGBT rights activists
AIDS-related deaths in California
American gay artists
Photographers from California
Photographers from Georgia (U.S. state)
20th-century American photographers
20th-century American LGBT people